Kabouter Plop (Plop the Gnome) is the eponymous protagonist in a children's television series by  Studio 100.

History 
Kabouter Plop was born on August 27, 1997. Then the first episode, entitled "The pendulum gramophone", was broadcast on VTM. On August 28, 1997, the second episode Taart for Kwebbel was broadcast. A total of 295 episodes were recorded and broadcast. A few feature films were also shot after that time. From September 2017, new episodes were broadcast under the name Plop en Felle. The children's program was a huge success, and actor Walter De Donder (61) returned to plaing the role of Plop after 14 years. "I'm still wearing my first suit and it still looks nice," jokes Walter De Donder when he recalls memories.
The television series is directed by Bart Van Leemputten and Gert Verhulst. Most episodes last about five minutes and are set in Plop's milk inn, which is a toadstool in which he sells plop-milk and plop-cookies, and it's also the place where most gnomes go for some Plop-cookies, Plop-milk, or Gnome-porridge. All the gnomes live in the Gnome forest. The stories often involve pranks by naughty Kabouter Klus ("Handy").  Each episode starts with Plop lying in bed and reviewing what happened the past day. At the end of the episode he says he goes to "Gnome dream land". Most episodes contain a moral.

Characters 

The characters in the movies are caricatured. Each gnome has its own typical quirks. Characteristic of all gnomes are the extremely fat bellies, long elf noses, the large clown shoes, and the two-pointed hats, the tips of which come up when they are startled. Their language is also typical of their exclamations.

Plop is the most responsible Gnome. He owns the milk inn and his red Gnome-toque shows the symbol of a heart. He wears glasses and has a white beard. Played by Walter De Donder.
Lui ("Lazy") tends to fall asleep often, and may be considered a narcoleptic. He is a mailman, and has the symbol of a letter on his blue Gnome-toque and a dark beard. Played by Chris Cauwenberghs.
Klus ("Handy") is a prankster, although he tends to be victim of his own pranks. He likes to build things, and brags about it. He has a patched green Gnome-toque and wears overalls, has glasses and a red beard. Played by Aimé Anthoni.
Kwebbel ("Chatter") is a gnome girl with long blond hair. She talks a lot and tends to repeat whatever was just said or just happened. She has a flower in her cap, and is frequently startled. Played by Agnes De Nul.
Smul ("Glutton") is obsessed with food and eats a lot. He is the leprechaun's cook, and heavier than the other Gnomes. He was added to the show in the second season. He has a short dark beard. Played by Luc Caals.
Smal ("Small") is the prettiest Gnome. She has brown hair, a tiny waist, and is very vain. Her yellow Gnome-toque has the symbol of a butterfly. She was introduced together with Smul (Glutton) in the second season. Played by Hilde Vanhulle.
 Felle ("Felle") is the young niece of Kabouter Plop. She was added on the occasion of the twentieth birthday of Kabouter Plop (Gnome Plop). Just like Plop, Felle has a heart on her hat and she can be recognized by her bright blue shoes. Played by Maxine Janssens.

The Gnome-Toques 
Every gnome in the franchise Kabouter Plop wears a hat called a "gnome-toque" in English, which has two hatpoints on the sides that raise when the gnomes are startled or surprised. There is a bell on both hatpoints that creates an iconic sound when the hat tips rise from shock or fear.

Popularity 
The franchise is not doing badly at all. Since 1997, the franchise has managed to conquer the hearts of all of the Netherlands and Belgium. Millions of children, who now go to Plop's shows with their children, have grown up with the gnomes. Kabouter Plop wrote hit history again on November 26, 2001. After previously breaking the record for longest-listed single, the Flemish gnome set a new hit record on this date. Never before had a single been listed in the Dutch charts for one year until the Kabouterdans (Mercury 5627152)charted, rising to place 41 in the Mega Top 100 and remaining there for exactly 52 weeks.

Foreign versions 
Lutin Plop is the French version of Kabouter Plop. Dubbed episodes from 2005 to 2007. Since 2007, the episodes are re-recorded.
Plop el Gnomo is the Spanish version of Kabouter Plop. Dubbed episodes from 2009.
Kabauter Plop is the German version of Kabouter Plop. Dubbed episodes from 2010.

Songs 
The songs of gnome Plop were a great success with young and old. Hits like 'de Kabouterdans' were in the charts of both Belgium and the Netherlands for weeks and the songs were even played at parties (with an often adult target audience). 'De Kabouterdans' was in the Mega Top 100 in the Netherlands in 2000, 2001 and 2002 for 64 weeks. This made it the longest-listed single ever for eight years. The record was broken on February 2, 2010. This song stayed in the Top 100 for 67 weeks.

Usually the songs are linked to specific, simple dance steps (see Kabouter Plop – De ganzenpas).

Amusement Parks 
Plopsaland of the production house Studio 100, which also includes gnome Plop, is located in Adinkerke – De Panne in Belgium (formerly Meli Park). There is currently also an indoor amusement park in Hasselt, and the park near the waterfalls of Coo was also purchased by Studio 100. In April 2010, the first Dutch park Plopsa Indoor Coevorden opened. The park in Germany is called Holiday Park Plopsa.

The Plop Newspaper 
From 11 March 1998 there was 'De Plopkrant' as a free supplement to Het Laatste Nieuws and De Nieuwe Gazet. This was a magazine with letters, stories and games. On July 19, 2000, 'De Plopkrant' made way for 'De Plopsakrant' after 124 editions.

List of Movies and Specials 

1	De Kabouterschat	1999
2	Plop in de Wolken	2000
3	Plop en de Toverstaf	2003
4	Plop en Kwispel	2004
5	Plop en het vioolavontuur	2005
6	Plop in de stad	2006
7	Plop en de Pinguïn	2007
8	De kabouterschat (remake)	2008
9	Plop en de kabouterbaby	2009
10	Plop wordt Kabouterkoning	2012

Products 
From 'Kabouter Plop' there are various commercial products available, such as school supplies, clothing, and foodstuffs such as cookies, milk and bread which are also used in the series itself.

References

External links 
 Studio 100
 Kabouter Plop
 Kabouter Plop – YouTube

Fictional gnomes
Fictional bartenders
Fictional characters from Flanders
Children's television characters
Belgian children's television shows
Belgian fantasy television series
1997 Belgian television series debuts
1990s Belgian television series
Television shows adapted into films
Television shows adapted into plays
Television shows adapted into comics